Le Hamel is the name of the following communes in France:

 Le Hamel, Oise, in the Oise department
 Le Hamel, Somme, in the Somme department
 Le Hamel, a hamlet of the commune of Asnelles, Calvados

See also
 Hamel (disambiguation)